Usmanovo (Uśman) is a rural locality (a village) in Saitbabinsky Selsoviet, Gafuriysky District, Bashkortostan, Russia. The population was 246 as of 2010. There are 7 streets.

Geography 
Usmanovo is located 47 km northeast of Krasnousolsky (the district's administrative centre) by road. Nekrasovka is the nearest rural locality.

References 

Rural localities in Gafuriysky District